Mauro Santambrogio (born 7 October 1984 in Erba) is a former Italian professional road racing cyclist, who last rode for UCI Continental team .

Career
In 2010, he was mentioned in the Mantova doping investigation, and was sidelined for a few days by his team; he was again sidelined in 2011 when new evidence showed up.

After leaving BMC at the end of the 2012 season, Santambrogio joined . He made an excellent start to the season, including finishing 6th overall in Tour de San Luis, 7th overall in Tirreno–Adriatico and winning the GP Industria & Artigianato di Larciano in pouring rain. Santambrogio then soloed his way to victory. Santambrogio then finished 2nd overall in Giro del Trentino. At the Giro d'Italia, Santambrogio won Stage 14 after attacking with race leader Vincenzo Nibali, to rise to fourth overall, and just one second off the final podium place occupied by Rigoberto Urán. However, Santambrogio's form collapsed and he eventually finished 9th overall. Santambrogio's surprising performances had caused rumours amongst the peloton of doping from early in the race.

Doping
On 3 June 2013, it was announced that Santambrogio had tested positive for erythropoietin (EPO) after the first stage of the 2013 Giro d'Italia. This came just a few weeks after teammate Danilo Di Luca was thrown out of the Giro for testing positive for the same substance. Santambrogio was also sacked by the team. Santambrogio was suspended by the UCI until 2 November 2014.

On 22 October 2014, Santambrogio tested positive for testosterone and was suspended for three years. Santambrogio said he would not seek to return once his suspension has been served.

Career achievements

Major results

2004
 2nd Tour du lac Leman
 5th Stausee-Rundfahrt Klingnau
 8th GP della Costa Etruschi
2005
 1st Giro del Lago Maggiore (GP Knorr)
 3rd  Road race, Mediterranean Games
 3rd Giro del Mendrisiotto
 5th Memorial Cimurri
 7th Coppa Sabatini
 7th Coppa Placci
2009
 1st Overall Tre Valli Varesine
 2nd Coppa Ugo Agostoni
 8th Overall Tour Down Under
2010
 2nd Coppa Ugo Agostoni
 5th GP Ouest–France
 8th Giro di Lombardia
2011
 2nd Giro della Toscana
2012
 4th Giro di Lombardia
 6th Clásica de San Sebastián
 6th Gran Piemonte
2013
 1st GP Industria & Artigianato di Larciano
 2nd Overall Giro del Trentino
 3rd Trofeo Laigueglia
 5th Gran Premio Città di Camaiore
 6th Overall Tour de San Luis
 7th Overall Tirreno–Adriatico

Grand Tour general classification results timeline

References

External links

Page on CyclingBase.com 

Italian male cyclists
1984 births
Living people
Cyclists from the Province of Como
Doping cases in cycling
Italian sportspeople in doping cases
Mediterranean Games bronze medalists for Italy
Mediterranean Games medalists in cycling
Competitors at the 2005 Mediterranean Games